The following is a list of notable actresses from Mainland China.

A
Aliya
An Yuexi
Angelababy

B
Bai Lu

C
Chen Duling
Chen Hao
Chen Hong
Joan Chen
Chen Sisi
Chen Xiaoxu
Chen Yumei
Chen Yunshang
Chen Yuqi
Ching Li

D
Deng Jie
Dilraba Dilmurat
Dong Jie

F
Fan Bingbing
Fan Ruijuan

G
Gao Xiumin
Gao Yuanyuan
Gong Beibi
Gong Li
Gu Yuezhen
Guan Xiaotong
Gulnazar

H
He Meitian
He Saifei
Huang Lu
Huang Shengyi
Huang Yi

J
Jiang Qinqin
Jiang Shuying
Jiang Wenli
Jiang Xin
Jing Tian
Ju Jingyi

L
Li Bingbing
Li Landi
Li Lingyu
Li Man
Li Qian
Li Xiaolu
Ling Tai
Leanne Liu
Liu Shishi
Liu Tao
Liu Xiaoqing
Liu Yan
Liu Yifei
Luo Yan

M
Mao Xiaotong
Meng Meiqi

N
Ni Ni
Ning Jing

O
Ouyang Nana

P
Pan Hong

Q
Qu Ying

R
Ren Yexiang
Ruan Lingyu

S
Shangguan Yunzhu
Shen Yue
Siqin Gaowa
Song Dandan
Sun Feifei
Sun Li

T
Tan Songyun
Tiffany Tang
Tang Wei
Tian Yuan
Tong Liya

W
Daisy Waite
Wan Peng
Wang Renmei
Wang Yan
Janice Wu
Wu Yin

X
Xing Fei
Xu Jiao
Xu Jinglei

Y
Yan Huizhu
Yang Mi
Yang Naimei
Yang Zi
Ye Qing
Julie Yeh
Yu Nan
Yu Shuxin
Yuan Li
Yuan Quan
Yuan Shanshan

Z
Zhang Jingchu
Zhang Xiaofei
Zhang Yuqi
Zhang Yuxi
Zhang Zifeng
Zhang Ziyi
Zhao Lusi
Zhao Tao
Zhao Wei
Zanilia Zhao
Zheng Shuang
Betty Zhou
Zhou Xuan
Zhou Xun

Actresses
Chinese
List
Actresses